Kearsley is a town in Bolton, Greater Manchester, England.

Kearsley may also refer to:

Kearsley, New South Wales, in the City of Cessnock, Australia
Kearsley, Northumberland, England, in Matfen parish
Kearsley (surname)
Kearsley Township, Michigan, a former civil township in Genesee County, Michigan, United States

See also
Keresley, a village in the City of Coventry, West Midlands, England